Pawawala is a village in the Punjab of Pakistan. It is located at 30°55'40N 70°52'5E with an altitude of 134 metres (442 feet).

References

Villages in Punjab, Pakistan